Bon Secours Hospital may refer to:

 Bon Secours Hospital, Cork, a private hospital in County Cork, Ireland
 Bon Secours Hospital, Dublin, a private hospital in Glasnevin, Dublin, Ireland
 Bon Secours Hospital, Galway, a private hospital in County Galway, Ireland
 Bon Secours Hospital, Tralee, a private hospital in County Kerry, Ireland
 Grace Medical Center (Baltimore), known as Bon Secours until December 2019
 Holy Family Hospital (Methuen), Massachusetts, formerly Bon Secours Hospital, now part of Steward Health Care System

See also
 Bon Secours Health System (USA)